St Joseph's College (abbreviated as SJC and commonly called Joeys) is an independent Roman Catholic single-sex secondary day and boarding school for boys, conducted in the Marist Brothers tradition, located in Hunters Hill, a suburb on the Lower North Shore of Sydney, New South Wales, Australia.

Founded by the Marist Brothers in 1881, Joeys currently caters for approximately 2000 students from Year 7 to Year 12, including over 750 boarders, making it the largest all boys boarding school in Australia, and one of the largest in the southern hemisphere.

The College is affiliated with the Association of Heads of Independent Schools of Australia (AHISA), the Australian Boarding Schools' Association (ABSA), the Association of Marist Schools of Australia (AMSA), and is a founding member of the Athletic Association of the Great Public Schools of New South Wales (AAGPS).

In 2006, Joeys saw the appointment of its first lay headmaster, Ross Tarlinton, who served from 2006 to 2017. He was succeeded in 2018 by another layman, Christopher Hayes.

History

Foundation
St Joseph's College (SJC) can trace its origins back to the Marist Brothers' school founded in Harrington Street, Church Hill, which was attached to St Patrick's Catholic Church. The Headmaster, Emilian Pontet then sought out land to found a new school elsewhere. After inspecting several locations, Hunters Hill was chosen due to its proximity to the Marist Fathers' Monastery and Parish of Villa Maria.

On 29 July 1881, the Headmaster, Emilian Pontet, moved the schools location from Harrington Street to Hunters Hill, founding St Joseph's College in a temporary wooden building with a student population of 55. Within six years of its founding, keen observers had taken notice. In 1887, James Francis Hogan wrote in The Irish in Australia that: 
St John's College, affiliated to the University of Sydney; Saint Ignatius' College, Riverview, conducted by the Jesuit Fathers; and St. Joseph's College, Hunter Hill , under the management of the Marist Brothers, are three educational institutions that reflect the highest credit on the Catholic population of the parent colony.

Brother Emilian Pontet was the founding headmaster (1881-1890); he was succeeded by Brother Stanislaus (1890-1894) who continued the building program at the main campus and oversaw the acquisition of 16 acres of playing fields close by.

These events took place in the aftermath of the Battle of Waterloo, the transition of NSW from a penal colony to a free settlement under the Governorship of Macquarie, the broader context of Victorian Era politics and activity from London such as Saint Joseph's Missionary Society of Mill Hill founded in 1866 by future Cardinal Herbert Alfred Vaughan. 19th Century Bishops such as Polding and Ullathorne were faithful witnesses to much missionary endeavour and Australia ceased being a mission territory simultaneously with Pope Paul VI writing to all the faithful of the entire world in "Evangelii Nuntiandi" on 8 December 1975.

Headmasters
The following individuals have served as Headmaster of St Joseph's College, Hunters Hill:

Campus

The College opened in 1881 in a temporary wooden building, however, it has continued to expand its grounds and buildings since then. Some examples are the construction of the main building's southern wing in 1882–1884; the building of the central and northern wing in 1889–1894 and the building of the Chapel in 1938–1940. The south-eastern corner of the College campus is a property which was acquired in 1882 with the assistance of a benefactor named O'Shaugnessy. The property was then known as Joubert's Reserve and the original small stone cottage that stood on the land when it was acquired still remains on the site today. The College's main playing fields ("the Park") are located 300m away from the main campus and were bought in 1893 from Charles Gilbert Heydon a distinguished lawyer and devout Catholic who offered the Brothers for sale at a discount 16 acres he had acquired nine years earlier. Heydon agreed to a generous instalment plan to assist the Brothers to make the purchase and the interest bill was met by the same benefactor O'Shaugnessy who had assisted with the acquisition of Joubert's Reserve eleven years earlier. Charles Gilbert Heydon was the brother of Louis Francis Heydon MLC, for a time the Australasian President of the St Vincent de Paul Society. Louis died on 17 May 1918 at his residence "Kentigern" at Mary Street Hunters Hill with a requiem mass at Villa Maria followed by a burial at the Field of Mars Cemetery. The Society report for the completed 1907 year refers to 10 new conferences in NSW, one being at St Joseph's College Hunters Hill - being the "first collegiate conference in the circumscription".

Today the College is situated on a  campus overlooking the Lane Cove and Parramatta Rivers, in suburban Hunter's Hill,  from the Sydney central business district. The current facilities of the school include:

Accommodation

St Joseph's has several buildings used for accommodation. Five of these are for Years 10, 11 and 12 respectively. The College's main building, which has stood since the 1880s, contains dorms for the junior years, as well as all the College's refectories (dining rooms), the Health Centre, Common Room, the College Chapel and administration offices. The Year 12 Boarding Area was totally refurbished in early 2009, creating modern and comfortable accommodation for senior students.

The College operates kitchens and a laundry catering for all students, teachers and brothers.

Academic facilities
The College has a significant number of academic facilities, including a large four-storey building solely containing science laboratories and classrooms (which have recently been refurbished), a library and resource centre, a visual arts centre, a music centre, a hall and five computer labs, each with 20 plus computers. Stage one of a major refurbishment of the resource centre was completed early in 2009, creating a modern, up-to-date teaching and learning facility that provides students with high quality resources and technology for today's fast paced digital world. In 2013, St. Joseph's opened a new Technology and Arts Precinct, including numerous art studios, workshops and classrooms.

Sporting facilities
Similar to other GPS schools, St Joseph's has significant sporting facilities for use in both training and competition. The College owns and maintains approximately 10 playing fields for cricket, rugby and football. The main playing fields are housed in a  facility known as "the Park" and located two blocks from the school campus and is often used by higher level teams for training purposes. The Park complex also contains 8 tennis courts.

On the main school campus there are five basketball courts, three playing fields (referred to as the 'back ovals'), a number of cricket nets, a swimming pool, two gymnasiums (for basketball and weightlifting respectively) and a cardio room.

Outdoor education facilities
In 1986 St Joseph's opened "Colo", an outdoor education centre for students. It provides education in various outdoor activities, culminating in extended expeditions in Year 9. The director is Paul Bryant.

Organisation

Marist Brothers
An ageing population of Marist brothers have their own accommodation on the school grounds (some in the retired brothers quarters) and work to maintain its status, holding a number of executive positions at the College. In 2006, Ross Tarlinton became the first lay headmaster of the College, followed by Dr Chris Hayes in 2017.

In 2019 the College farewelled the last teaching Marist Brother, Br Anthony Boyd (1969), who after 40 years of service at the College (23 as Deputy Headmaster), retired from his duties at the College.

Sexual abuse allegations 
In June, July and August 2014 the Royal Commission into Institutional Responses to Child Sexual Abuse, a royal commission of inquiry initiated in 2013 by the Australian Government and supported by all of its state governments, began an investigation into the response of Marist Brothers to allegations of child sexual abuse in schools in the ACT, NSW and Queensland.

In March 2015 a former Marist brother, Francis William Cable, known as Brother Romuald was arrested over a number of sex offences allegedly committed at St Joseph's College and St Gregory's College in Campbelltown in the 1980s.

In 2021, a Marist Brother John Patrick O'Brien who worked at the school in the 1970's was convicted of a number of child sexual abuses which occurred at the school. On 5 November 2021 O’Brien was given a head sentence of 7 years 9 months, 5 years non parole and is available for parole on 14 April 2026.

Boarding
With a boarding population of approximately 500, SJC is the largest boarding school for boys in Australia (in terms of student numbers). Joeys offers full boarding as well as weekly boarding options (where students go home on weekends). In recent times the College has also offered day-schooling, and students who do not board are known as 'day-boys'.

The College has a long history of boarders from regional and rural Australia, with generations of families hailing from Dubbo, Mudgee, Bourke, Griffith and beyond. In 2016, the College launched the 'Boys from the Bush' program, providing means-tested bursaries to families from country areas. As of January 2019, 33 boys from across Australia were benefitting from the program.

A number of dormitories ('dorms') and refectories ('refs') are located on the College grounds for boarders and day-boys alike.  Dorms and refs are segregated by year, and students tend to receive larger, more private and more privileged accommodation as they advance through the years(i.e. students move from large dormitories to single rooms, and from the College's original accommodation facilities to newly built accommodation).

Curriculum
As a secondary school in New South Wales, the College teaches Year 7 to 12 students in accordance with the State Government's education curriculum, as determined by the Board of Studies. At the end of Year 12, successful students are accredited with their Higher School Certificate (HSC).

Co-curriculum
St Joseph's College offers a variety of co-curricular activities, including Senior Orchestra, Chess and Debating. Joeys also has the reputation of being a very strong sporting school.

Sport
St Joseph's official sporting calendar revolves around competition with the eight other GPS Schools. However, it regularly competes against The Associated Schools (CAS) during the lead-up to each season, and as a member of the GPS (in GPS v CAS matches) at the end of each season. 

GPS sports include athletics, Australian rules football, basketball, cricket, cross country, football (soccer), tennis, rowing, rugby union, swimming, and water polo.

Rugby union
St. Joseph's has a very proud, strong tradition in rugby union, being widely renowned as one of Australia's great rugby nurseries. Over the years, the college has produced many well known players who have represented at grade, state and national levels, including three Wallaby Captains. St. Joseph's proud history is displayed through their many 1st and 2nd XV premierships in the AAGPS competitions. Their most recent 1st XV success was in 2019, where the college won their 56th 1st XV premiership while the 2nd XV and 3rd XV were also undefeated to win their premierships.

Football 
St Joseph's has a storied history in AAGPS Football, winning premierships in both the 1st & 2nd XI in the inaugural competition in 1988. The College has won three 1st XI premierships (1988, 1997, 2012) and three 2nd XI premierships (1988, 1998, 2012). The 'Lower Park' complex was refurbished in 2019 with a new grandstand and dugouts, and hosts one of the premier natural turf Football pitches in Sydney.

Cricket
Cricket has always been one of the premier summer sports at St. Joseph's. The college has always been strong in cricket, dating back to the inaugural AAGPS season, in which St. Joseph's shared the premiership along with Sydney Grammar School and Newington College. Stan McCabe remains the college's most well known cricketer. In recent years, St Joseph's has been consistently one of the best high school cricketing teams, winning both the AAGPS Premiership and Marist Cricket Carnival on multiple occasions.

Rowing
St. Joseph's was the fourth Sydney school to take to the water (after Grammar, Riverview & Shore) and has been rowing in the GPS competition since 1907. Joeys had their inaugural GPS victory in 1911, then again in 1916. The College's 1st VIII victory in the 2015 race ended a drought dating back to 1973 at the AAGPS Head of the River.

Notable alumni: 'Old Boys' 

Alumni of St Joseph's College, Hunter's Hill are commonly referred to as Old Boys, and may elect to join the schools alumni association, the St Joseph's College Old Boys' Union (SJCOBU).

See also 

 List of Catholic schools in New South Wales
 Catholic education in Australia
List of boarding schools in Australia
Lawrence Campbell Oratory Competition

References

Bibliography
 Naughtin, M. 1981. A Century of Striving: St Joseph's College, Hunter's Hill, 1881-1981. Macarthur Press, Sydney. .
 Meliora Life, edition II May 2011 (a publication of the St Joseph's College Foundation Ltd).

External links

 St Joseph's College Website
 Marist Brothers Website

Boarding schools in New South Wales
Educational institutions established in 1881
Catholic secondary schools in Sydney
Association of Marist Schools of Australia
Boys' schools in New South Wales
Catholic boarding schools in Australia
1881 establishments in Australia
Municipality of Hunter's Hill
Athletic Association of the Great Public Schools of New South Wales
Marist Brothers schools